Ladislau Rohony (born 1 September 1938) is a Romanian fencer. He competed in the individual and team sabre events at the 1960 Summer Olympics.

References

External links
 

1938 births
Living people
Sportspeople from Cluj-Napoca
Romanian male sabre fencers
Olympic fencers of Romania
Fencers at the 1960 Summer Olympics